American Dream is the second EP by pop rock band Rocky Loves Emily, released on November 22, 2010 by Tooth & Nail Records. It was produced by Casey Bates and is the follow-up to the band's independent debut, the What What What EP.

Background and recording 

In early 2010, Rocky Loves Emily was on Copeland's farewell tour. At a Seattle spot on the tour, an A&R executive from Tooth & Nail Records spotted them, subsequently bringing them to the attention of the label and getting them signed. While waiting for Tooth & Nail to officially announce the signing, the band spent the summer of 2010 recording demos for the inevitable album in Michigan, at a cabin owned by drummer Pete Kalinowski's family. At the end of the summer, Tooth & Nail flew the band back to Seattle to record with producer Casey Bates.

Release and promotion 
The EP was released on November 22, 2010. The release was preceded by the lead single "Clueless", which was accompanied by a music video depicting the band holding auditions to find a lead singer.

Reception 

American Dream received largely positive critical reception. Samantha Schaumberg of Jesus Freak Hideout deemed it a "more than satisfactory first release": "Very little new ground is explored musically, but Rock Loves Emily's polished sound definitely makes them a worthy competitor in the genre." AbsolutePunk's Ryan Gardner found the record's flaws to be "mainly a lack of depth or innovation," as well as the lyrics "[pulling] the record down incalculably, as well, with nearly every track being about girls." Nevertheless, he concluded that "there’s no denying how ridiculously catchy each track sounds...if these six guys can grow and mature with their music and lyrics – perhaps taking hints from many of T&N’s other bands – they definitely will have a bright future."

Track listing 
"American Dream" — 2:37
"Clueless" — 2:47
"See Her Again" — 2:39
"Name Of The Game" — 2:49
"There's A Word For You" — 2:52

Personnel 
Brandon Ellis — vocals
Sean Kick — guitar
Wood Simmons - — bass
Andrew Stevens — guitar
Stephen Hull — keyboards
Pete Kalinowski — drums
Casey Bates — production

References 

2010 EPs
Pop rock EPs
Indie rock EPs
Tooth & Nail Records EPs